Gifford is an unincorporated community in Barkley Township, Jasper County, Indiana, United States.

History
A post office opened at Gifford in 1899, and remained in operation until it was discontinued in 1920. The community was named for its founder, Benjamin J. Gifford.

Geography

References

Unincorporated communities in Jasper County, Indiana
Unincorporated communities in Indiana